Michigan's 47th House of Representatives district (also referred to as Michigan's 47th House district) is a legislative district within the Michigan House of Representatives located in part of Jackson and Washtenaw counties. The district was created in 1965, when the Michigan House of Representatives district naming scheme changed from a county-based system to a numerical one.

List of representatives

Recent Elections

Historical district boundaries

References 

Michigan House of Representatives districts
Livingston County, Michigan